Hampshire is one of the eighteen counties which make up the first-class structure of English county cricket. It has produced international cricketers for the England cricket team in all forms of the game — Tests, One Day Internationals (ODIs) and Twenty20 Internationals (T20Is). No player born in Hampshire has ever captained England. Victor Barton, from Netley, became the first Hampshire-born player to represent England when he played against South Africa in 1892, which was his only Test appearance. Nine cricketers born in Hampshire have represented England, with Chris Tremlett, born in Southampton, the last. Sean Terry, born in Southampton, is the only international player born in Hampshire to represent another nation, in this case Ireland. 111 cricketers born outside of Hampshire have played county cricket for Hampshire, as well as playing international cricket. Of these, 75 have played international cricket for a team other than England, while 4 have played internationally, but not in matches recognised by the ICC. 3 cricketers who represented Hampshire Cricket Board but not Hampshire have also played international cricket, their statistics are also listed below.

From Hampshire
Key
 Apps denotes the number of appearances the player has made.
 Runs denotes the number of runs scored by the player.
 Wkts denotes the number of wickets taken by the player.

''Statistics correct as of: 2 October 2022

England

Ireland

Played for Hampshire CCC
The cricketers listed in this section have played for Hampshire County Cricket Club and played Test, One Day Internationals and Twenty20 Internationals for an international team, but were not born in the county. Players are listed in order from the year of their International debut.

Afghanistan

Africa XI

Asia XI

Australia

Denmark
Thomas Hansen (Hampshire 1997–1999) played 23 List A matches and 19 ICC Trophy matches for Denmark (1997–2005), but these did not have International status.

England

Guernsey
Lee Savident (Hampshire 1997–2000) and Tim Ravenscroft (Hampshire 2011) have both represented Guernsey (Savident 1993–2014 and Ravenscroft 2008–2015) in List A and T20 matches, but none of these games had International status.

India

Italy

Netherlands

New Zealand

Pakistan

Scotland

South Africa

Sri Lanka

United States

West Indies

World XI

Zimbabwe

See also
Hampshire County Cricket Club
List of Hampshire County Cricket Club first-class players
List of Hampshire County Cricket Club List A players
List of Hampshire County Cricket Club Twenty20 players

Notes

References

Hampshire County Cricket Club

Hampshire
Cricketers